The Contract Act, 1872 is the chief contract law in Bangladesh. Based on English contract law and the British Indian contract law, it was enacted in the 19th century and re-enacted by the Parliament of Bangladesh after the country's independence. It includes chapters on offer and acceptance, voidable contracts, contingent contracts, performance, breach of contract, contractual relations, the sale of goods, bailment, agency and partnership. It also covers topics such as consideration, misrepresentation and indemnity.

See also
Sale of Goods Act, 1930 (Bangladesh)
Joint Stock Companies Act 1844

References

Law of Bangladesh
Contract law